Jason David Lee (born 21 May 1970)) is an English field hockey coach and former international player. Lee was born at Hayes in Greater London and played hockey at Old Bordenians Hockey Club in Sittingbourne in Kent.

International career
As a player, he won 82 caps for England and 35 for Great Britain, scoring 35 goals. He played in the 1992 and 1996 Summer Olympics, but retired after the 1998 World Cup to take up coaching.

Coaching career
Lee started coaching for England men from 2003 and Great Britain men from 2004. His squads competed at three successive Olympic Games (2004, 2008 and 2012), and took England to their first ever European title, at the 2009 EuroHockey Nations Championship. He stood down after the 2012 Summer Olympics in order to start coaching the England women's squad.

Lee led the England men's team from 11th to 4th in the FIH World Rankings and also took the England women's team to a World Ranking high of 3rd, after achieving a silver medal with them in the 2013 European Nations, losing to Germany on penalties in the final. He stood down from coaching England and Great Britain in 2014. He was a Head Coach for England and GB for eleven years, GB's longest ever serving international head coach.

Lee has played club hockey for Loughborough and East Grinstead. He was named in Loughborough University's Sporting Hall of Fame in 2010 alongside greats such as Lord Sebastian Coe. He is also a member of UKSport's Elite Coach alumni.

Lee works in human performance for business and sport and is known as an experienced and knowledgeable person in leadership, teams and organizational performance.

References

External links
 

1970 births
Living people
English male field hockey players
English field hockey coaches
Field hockey players at the 1992 Summer Olympics
Field hockey players at the 1996 Summer Olympics
1998 Men's Hockey World Cup players
Olympic field hockey players of Great Britain
British male field hockey players
Alumni of Loughborough University
Loughborough Students field hockey players
East Grinstead Hockey Club players
British Olympic coaches